Robert Monell (April 25, 1787November 29, 1860) was an American lawyer and politician from New York. From 1829 to 1831, he served one term in the  U.S. House of Representatives as a  Jacksonian.

Life
Monell was born in Columbia County, New York on April 25, 1787. Monell studied law, was admitted to the bar in 1809, and commenced practice at Binghamton, New York. In 1811, he removed to Greene.

Political career 
He was a member from Chenango County of the New York State Assembly in 1814-15.

Congress 
Monell was elected as a Democratic-Republican to the 16th United States Congress, holding office from March 4, 1819, to March 3, 1821.

He was again a member of the State Assembly in 1825, 1826 and 1828; and was D.A. of Chenango County in 1827.

Monell was elected as a Jacksonian to the 21st United States Congress, holding office from March 4, 1829, to February 21, 1831, when he resigned.

Later career and death 
He was Judge of the Sixth Circuit Court from 1831 to 1846. Afterwards he resumed the practice of law;

He died in 1860 in Greene, New York, and was buried at the Hornby Cemetery.

External links

The New York Civil List compiled by Franklin Benjamin Hough (pages 189, 202f, 206, 292, 356 and 371; Weed, Parsons and Co., 1858)

Members of the New York State Assembly
1860 deaths
1787 births
People from Greene, New York
People from Columbia County, New York
New York (state) state court judges
County district attorneys in New York (state)
Politicians from Binghamton, New York
Democratic-Republican Party members of the United States House of Representatives from New York (state)
Jacksonian members of the United States House of Representatives from New York (state)
19th-century American politicians
Lawyers from Binghamton, New York
Members of the United States House of Representatives from New York (state)